Don Beuth (born 6 June 1941) is a New Zealand cricketer. He played in three first-class matches for Central Districts in 1968/69.

See also
 List of Central Districts representative cricketers

References

External links
 

1941 births
Living people
New Zealand cricketers
Central Districts cricketers
Cricketers from Gisborne, New Zealand